Fríðrikur Petersen (April 22, 1853 – April 26, 1917) was a noted Faroese Unionist politician and clergyman.

Biography
Petersen was born at Saltnes in Eysturoy. He was the son of  Johannes Petersen (1812–1901) and Susanne Frederikke Olesdatter (1826–1905). He became a student in Reykjavik, Iceland in 1875 and was  awarded his Cand.theol. in 1880.  He was ordained a Lutheran priest in the Church of the Faroe Islands (Fólkakirkjan). He served as parish priest at Sandoynni (1880),  Suðuroy (1885) and at  Østerø (1900). He was a rural dean  at Nes  in Eysturoy from 1900 to 1917.  

Petersen was chairman of the Sambandpartiet from its foundation in 1906 until his death  in 1917.
He was a member of the Faroese Løgting (1890) and the Danish Landsting (1892–1900). He served as county councilor for the Faroe Islands 1894–1902.

Personal life
He was married in 1880  with Sophie Amalie Wesenberg (1861–1919).
He died during 1917 in Copenhagen.

Frederik's Church in Nes

Fredericks Church  (Fríðrikskirkjan) in Nes was completed in 1994 and was named in honor of Fríðrikur Petersen.

See also
Faroese People's Church

References

1853 births
1917 deaths
Lutheran bishops in Europe
Faroese Lutheran clergy
Faroese politicians
Faroese members of the Folketing
Members of the Løgting
People from Eysturoy